Vuollerim is a locality situated in Jokkmokk Municipality, Norrbotten County, Sweden with 732 inhabitants in 2010.

Notable people
Zemya Hamilton
Jakob Hellman
Jokkmokks-Jokke
Birgitta Svendén
Lars-Göran Nilsson
Lars Albin Eriksson

References

External links

www.vuollerim.se

Populated places in Jokkmokk Municipality
Lapland (Sweden)